Jenny Smart (born 19 February 1943) is a British sprinter. She competed in the women's 100 metres at the 1960 Summer Olympics.

References

1943 births
Living people
Athletes (track and field) at the 1960 Summer Olympics
British female sprinters
Olympic athletes of Great Britain
Place of birth missing (living people)
Olympic female sprinters